The 1908 St. Louis Cardinals season was the team's 27th season in St. Louis, Missouri and its 17th season in the National League. The Cardinals had a 49–105 win–loss record during the season and finished 8th (last) in the National League. The season's attendance of 185,377, an average of less than 2,500 a game, which remains the lowest peacetime attendance level since 1901. The Cardinals set a Major League record which stills stands for the fewest base on balls by a team in a season, with 282.  Additionally, they hold the MLB record for fewest runs scored in a season with 372, averaging only 2.42 runs per contest.

Regular season

Season summary 
The Cardinals ranked last in three categories in the National League: runs scored (only 372), runs allowed (624), and errors committed (349). The team was shut out a record 33 times.  Three lineup regulars batted below .200.  Only three players drove in more than 20 runs, and the team lost more than 100 games for the second and last time in franchise history.  The Cards set a club record with 105 losses and a league record for most defeats in a month when they went 7–27 in September (Brooklyn went 6–27 that same month).

One team member, Bugs Raymond, ranked among the league leaders in fewest hits per nine innings, resulting in a 2.03 ERA.  However, the Cardinals were shut out 11 times on days Raymond took the hill, leading to his league-high 25 losses. His 15 wins accounted for almost a third of the team's wins. Of note, he gave up fewer hits per game than Christy Mathewson, and threw five shutouts.

In April 1908, the Cardinals played the St. Louis Browns in an exhibition game to raise money for former Cardinals owner Chris von der Ahe. The clubs raised $4,300.

Season standings

Record vs. opponents

Roster

Player stats

Batting

Starters by position 
Note: Pos = Position; G = Games played; AB = At bats; H = Hits; Avg. = Batting average; HR = Home runs; RBI = Runs batted in

Other batters 
Note: G = Games played; AB = At bats; H = Hits; Avg. = Batting average; HR = Home runs; RBI = Runs batted in

Pitching

Starting pitchers 
Note: G = Games pitched; IP = Innings pitched; W = Wins; L = Losses; ERA = Earned run average; SO = Strikeouts

Other pitchers 
Note: G = Games pitched; IP = Innings pitched; W = Wins; L = Losses; ERA = Earned run average; SO = Strikeouts

Relief pitchers 
Note: G = Games pitched; W = Wins; L = Losses; SV = Saves; ERA = Earned run average; SO = Strikeouts

References

External links
1908 St. Louis Cardinals at Baseball Reference
1908 St. Louis Cardinals team page at www.baseball-almanac.com

St. Louis Cardinals seasons
Saint Louis Cardinals season
St Louis